Alexandra Wood is a British dramatist. She is a winner of the George Devine Award in 2007.

Plays
The Human Ear (Paines Plough)
Ages (Old Vic New Voices)
English version of German dramatist Manfred Karge's version of Brecht's Man to Man (Wales Millennium Centre)
Merit (Theatre Royal, Plymouth) 2015
The Initiate (Paines Plough), winner of Scotsman Fringe First Award 2014, restaged Southbank Centre 2015
adaptation of Jung Chang's Wild Swans (ART/Young Vic)
The Empty Quarter (Hampstead Theatre)
The Centre (Islington Community Theatre)
Decade (co-writer, Headlong)
Unbroken (Gate)
The Lion's Mouth (Royal Court Rough Cuts)
The Eleventh Capital (Royal Court) 2007
Twelve Years (BBC Radio 4).

References

Living people
1982 births
Place of birth missing (living people)
British dramatists and playwrights